Sophia Senoron (born October 8, 1999) is a Filipino actress, host, model and a beauty pageant titleholder who won the title of Miss Multinational 2017 on February 24, 2018, in New Delhi, India. She is the first representative of Philippines to the said pageant and became the first titleholder of Miss Multinational pageant. She is also the youngest representative of Philippines to any of the international beauty pageants.

Pageantry and showbiz

Miss World Philippines 2017 
Sophia participated in the national pageant, Miss World Philippines 2017 held on 3 September 2017 at the Mall of Asia Arena, Pasay, Philippines. At the end of the event, she was crowned as Miss Multinational Philippines 2017 becoming the first representative of Philippines to Miss Multinational pageant.

Miss Multinational 2017 
Sophia represented Philippines at Miss Multinational 2017 held on 24 February 2018 at the Kingdom of Dreams, Gurgaon, India where she was declared as the winner becoming the first ever titleholder of Miss Multinational pageant. During the competition, she also won the awards for Best in Interview, Miss Environment and Miss Speech.

Post-Miss Multinational, acting and hosting career 
Senoron made her acting debut on the 2018 film Walwal.

She later signed a contract with GMA Network, along with fellow beauty queens Michelle Dee and Laura Lehmann on July 2, 2018.

In February 2021, Senoron started becoming a host in the 96th season of NCAA, along with sports anchor and fellow Sparkle artist Martin Javier.

Senoron is set to appear at Voltes V: Legacy this 2023.

Filmography

Movie

Television

Notes

References

External links 

 
 https://www.gmanetwork.com/sparkle/artists/sophiasenoron

1999 births
Living people
Miss World Philippines winners

Filipino television actresses
GMA Network personalities